Major Charles B. Lohmiller (circa 1867 – 21 June 1932) was also known as Hum-Pa-Zee (which is Sioux for "Yellow Shoes").

Biography 
He served as a Major at the Fort Peck Indian Agency that controlled the Fort Peck Indian Reservation in Fort Peck, Montana from 1893 to 1917, and was Superintendent of the Agency from 1904 to 1917.

References 

People from Valley County, Montana
United States Army officers
United States Bureau of Indian Affairs personnel
1867 births
1932 deaths